The Vijay for Best Costume Designer is given by STAR Vijay as part of its annual Vijay Awards ceremony for Tamil  (Kollywood) films.

The list
Here is a list of the award winners and the films for which they won.

Nominations 
2008 Gouthami Tadimalla - Dasavathaaram
Moorthy - Santosh Subramaniam
Nalini Sriram - Vaaranam Aayiram
Natarajan - Subramaniyapuram
2009 Anu Vardhan - Sarvam
Chaitanya and Sai - Kanthaswamy
Moorthy - Naan Kadavul
Nalini Sriram - Ayan 
Sai Babu - Kanchivaram
2010 Deepali Noor - Madrasapattinam
Erum Ali - Aayirathil Oruvan
Nalini Sriram - Vinnaithaandi Varuvaayaa
Manish Malhotra - Enthiran
Sai - Irumbukkottai Murattu Singam
 2011 Anu Vardhan & Moorthy - 7aum Arivu
Nalini Sriram - Engeyum Kadhal
Swetha Srinivas - Ko
Natarajan - Vaagai Sooda Vaa
Vasuki Bhaskar - Mankatha
 2012 S. Rajendran - Aravaan
Gabreilla Wilkins  - Mugamoodi
Ganesh - Kumki
Kunal Rawal, Deepali Noor, Sai - Nanban
Vinesh Arora, Sarin - Podaa Podi
 2013 Perumal Selvam & Poornima Ramaswamy - Paradesi
 Chaitanya Rao, Deepali Noor, Kaviza Raebhela & Sathya - Raja Rani
 Chaitanya Rao, Nikhila Sukumar & Malinipriya - Endrendrum Punnagai
 Deepali Noor - Irandam Ulagam
 Gautami - Vishwaroopam
 2014 Perumal & Niranjani Agathiyan - Kaaviya Thalaivan
Deepali Noor - Kaththi
James - Mundasupatti
Nikhaar Dhawan - Lingaa
Sathya NJ, Vasuki Bhaskar & Moorthy - Maan Karate

See also
 Tamil cinema
 Cinema of India

References

Costumes